Miss Ukraine Universe 2009, the 14th edition of the Miss Ukraine Universe pageant was held in Freedom Concert Hall in Kyiv. Eleonora Masalab of Kharkiv Oblast crowned Khrystyna Kots-Hotlib of Donetsk Oblast as her successor at the end of the event.

Results

Judges 
 Sergei Tsiupko
 Yaroslav Gres
 Sergei Zhigunov
 Svetlana Svetlichnaya
 Alexandra Ruffin
 Eric Trump

External links 
 

2009
2009 beauty pageants
2009 in Ukraine
February 2009 events in Ukraine